is a Japanese women's professional shogi player ranked 1-kyū.

Early life, education and amateur shogi
Wada was born in Wakō, Saitama on January 14, 2002. She became interested in shogi from watching her father, older brother and older sister play when she about five years old, and entered the Japan Shogi Association's training group system in 2011 as a student of shogi professional Yūki Fujikura in October 2011 when she was nine years old. As a sixth grade elementary school student, she won the 7th  in 2013. Wada won the 46th , and finished second in girl's division of the 35th  in 2014 as a twelve-year-old first grade junior high school student.

Wada's plan to become a women's professional shogi player, however, was put on hold when she moved to Houston with her parents due to her father's work. While living in Houston she continued to play shogi and won the United States Shogi Championship in 2018 when she was fifteen years old. After returning to Japan, she won the 27th  in January 2019 as second year high school student.  

Wada qualified for the rank of women's professional 2-kyū in July 2020 after being promoted to training group B2. She applied for women's professional status and her application was accepted by the Japan Shogi Association; she was granted women's professional status on September 1, 2020.

After graduating from high school, Wada was accepted into the School of Social Sciences of Waseda University.

Women's shogi professional

Promotion history
Wada's promotion history is as follows:

 2-kyū: September 1, 2020
 1-kyū: May 28, 2021

Note: All ranks are women's professional ranks.

Personal life
Wada's older sister Aki is also a women's professional shogi player, and the two are the fourth pair of sisters to be awarded women's professional shogi player status.

References

External links
 ShogiHub: Wada, Hana

2002 births
Living people
Japanese shogi players
Women's professional shogi players
Professional shogi players from Saitama Prefecture
Waseda University alumni